The Avenue of Technology is a city designated technology-based district which is located on a segment of Market Street in Philadelphia, Pennsylvania. The area is known for being the "portal of technology" of the city that includes the University City Science Center and Drexel University.

History
The area was originally dedicated by the mayor Ed Rendell with street plates acknowledging this section of road with turquoise signs.

In May 2014, a project with Google Earth was launched to document the mobility in the region.

Gallery

See also

 Market Street (Philadelphia)
 Avenue of the Arts (Philadelphia), also designated by former Mayor Ed Rendell

References
Notes

Culture of Philadelphia
Tourist attractions in Philadelphia